Corvinae is one of five subfamilies in the crow family (Corvidae).  It comprises 64 species, which are spread over seven genera.

References

Corvidae
Bird subfamilies